Michel Blondy (1675–1739) was a French choreographer, dancer and ballet master.

Works 
All his choreographies were premiered at the Académie royale de musique
 1714: Les Fêtes de Thalie, music by Mouret
 1721: Les Fêtes vénitiennes, music by Campra
 1728: , music by Alexandre de Villeneuve
 1728: Hypermnestre, music by Gervais
 1729: Les Amours des déesses, music by Lully (on a libretto by Philippe Quinault)
 1730: Phëton, music by Lully 
 1732: Callirhoé, music by Destouches
 1732: Les Sens, music by Mouret
 1733: Les Fêtes grecques et romaines, music by Blamont
 1734: Les Éléments, music by Lalande et Destouches
 1734: Pirithoüs, music by Mouret
 1734: Les Plaisirs champêtres, music by Rebel
 1735: Les Indes galantes, music by Rameau
 1736: Les Voyages de l'amour, music by Boismortier
 1739: Alceste, music by Lully

External links 
 Michel Blondy on Data.bnf.fr

1675 births
1739 deaths
French ballet masters
French choreographers
French male ballet dancers
18th-century French ballet dancers
Paris Opera Ballet étoiles
Paris Opera Ballet artistic directors